Dottie Dartland Zicklin (born in Florida in 1964) is an American television writer and producer.

Zicklin graduated from the Massachusetts Institute of Technology in 1986. She is the co-creator of the sitcoms Caroline in the City, Dharma & Greg, and Are You There, Chelsea?, and has written and produced other series, including Grace Under Fire and Cybill. Her production company is called 4 to 6 Foot Productions, a reference to surfing, one of her passions.

Awards
She was twice nominated for WGA Awards from the Writers Guild of America.
 1999 - Nominated, WGA Award (TV) for Episodic Comedy, for Dharma & Greg episode "Pilot." Shared with Chuck Lorre.
 1991 - Nominated, WGA Award (TV) for Episodic Drama, for China Beach episode "Warriors." Shared with Martin M. Goldstein and Neal Baer.

Personal
Zicklin is married to fellow television producer/writer Eric Zicklin.

References

External links

1964 births
American television producers
American women television producers
American television writers
Living people
People from Florida
American women television writers
20th-century American women writers
21st-century American women